Walton (Merseyside) railway station is a railway station in Walton, Liverpool, England, located to the north of the city centre.  It is on the Ormskirk branch of the Merseyrail network's Northern Line.

History
Originally named Walton Junction when opened by the Liverpool, Ormskirk and Preston Railway on 2 April 1849, the station was renamed Walton (Merseyside) by British Rail.  It is located just to the north of the junction between the Ormskirk and  branches of the Northern Line.

Facilities
The station ticket office is staffed throughout the hours of service each day, closing shortly after midnight.  At platform level, there are shelters on each side, information screens and timetable notice boards.  Automated announcements are also used to convey train running information.  Step-free access is only possible from the car park to the southbound platform, as access to the ticket office and via the footbridge to the northbound platform require the use of stairs.
There is car parking for 10 vehicles and secure storage for 10 cycles.
During November 2018 the height, width and layout of the platforms were adjusted to prepare for Merseyrail's new fleet of trains which are due to be introduced from 2020.

Services
Trains operate every 15 minutes (Monday to Saturday daytime) between Ormskirk and Liverpool Central, and every 30 minutes at other times (evenings and all day Sunday).

Gallery

References

External links

Railway stations in Liverpool
DfT Category E stations
Former Lancashire and Yorkshire Railway stations
Railway stations in Great Britain opened in 1849
Railway stations served by Merseyrail
1849 establishments in England